Back Up n da Chevy is the second and final studio album by American Southern hip hop group Boyz n da Hood. It was released on August 7, 2007 through Bad Boy South/Atlantic Records. Production was handled by Dee Jay Dana, The Runners, Big Duke, Carl Mo, Caviar, Crown Kingz Productions, Drumma Boy, Fangaz and Oz, with P. Diddy and Russell Spencer serving as executive producers. It features guest appearances from Yung Joc, Alfamega, Durty, Ice Cube, Rick Ross, T-Rok and T-Pain. The album debuted at number 51 on the Billboard 200 chart in the United States selling 15,700 units, and felt to number 100 on its second week, selling 8,300 copies.

The album's first single is "Everybody Know Me", which was released on iTunes on April 10, 2007. The second single was confirmed to be "Table Dance" featuring T-Pain, but it was never released.

Track listing

Personnel

Alonzo "Gorilla Zoe" Mathis – main artist
Jacoby "Jody Breeze" White – main artist
Lee "Big Duke" Dixon – main artist, producer (track 10)
Miguel "Big Gee" Scott – main artist
Jasiel "Yung Joc" Robinson – featured artist (tracks: 4, 5, 7)
O'Shea "Ice Cube" Jackson – featured artist (track 6)
Tenarius "T-Rok" Richardson – featured artist (track 7)
Cedric "AlfaMega" Zellars – featured artist (track 7)
Ernest "Durty" Gibbs – featured artist (track 7)
William "Rick Ross" Roberts – featured artist (track 9)
Faheem "T-Pain" Najm – featured artist (track 11)
"Dee Jay Dana" Ramey – producer (tracks: 1, 3, 4, 6-8, 11, 13), recording (tracks: 1-4, 6-11, 13), mixing (tracks: 1, 3, 4, 8, 11), mixing assistant (tracks: 5, 7, 10)
Carlton "Carl Mo" Mahone, Jr. – producer (track 2)
Nico Solis – producer & recording (track 5), mixing (track 6)
Howard White – producer (track 5)
Mike Davis – producer (track 5)
Christopher "Drumma Boy" Gholson – producer (track 9)
Mike "Fangaz" Simmon – producer (track 10)
Kannon "Caviar" Cross – producer (track 12)
Corey "Oz" Simon – producer (track 12)
Russell "Block" Spencer – executive producer
Sean "P. Diddy" Combs – executive producer
Harve "Joe Hooker" Pierre – co-executive producer
Conrad "Rad" Dimanche – associate executive producer
Thomas "Tom Cat" Bennett, Jr. – recording (tracks: 1-4, 6-11, 13), mixing (tracks: 5, 7, 10), mixing assistant (tracks: 1, 3, 4, 8, 11)
Carlos "Los" Brown – recording (track 1)
Alexis Seton – recording (track 2)
John Frye – mixing (track 2)
Leslie Brathwaite – mixing (track 9)
Kori Anders – mixing assistant (track 9)
Lester Purnell – recording (track 11)
Brent Spann – recording (track 12)
Joe Warlick – mixing (track 12)
Chris Athens – mastering
Patrick Fong – design
Peter Graham – photography
Elexia Cook – A&R
Kerry Carter – A&R
Rico Brooks – management

Charts

References

External links

2007 albums
Boyz n da Hood albums
Bad Boy Records albums
Albums produced by Drumma Boy